Buse Güngör (born October 2, 1994) is a Turkish women's football  attacking midfielder currently playing in the Women's First League for Kireçburnu Spor with jersey number 20. She is a member of the Turkey women's national U-19 team.

Playing career

Club
Buse Güngör obtained her license on June 10, 2008. She played three seasons for Gölcükspor in her hometown, the last season in the First League. She capped 45 times and scored 16 goals with Gölcükspor. In the 2011–12 season, she transferred to İzmit Belediyespor, where she appeared in 19 matches scoring 7 goals in one season. The next season, she moved to the Second-League team İzmit Çenesuyu Plajyoluspor, however she left at the end of the season's halftime for Derince Belediyespor playing again in the First League. She played two seasons with Derince Belediyespor, where she capped in 19 matches and scored 2 goals.

In the 2014–15 season, she transferred to the Istanbul-based Second League team Kireçburnu Spor due to withdrawal of her club from the league. At the end of the season, her team enjoyed promotion to the Women's First League. Her team won the play-off matches of the season, and were promoted to the Women's First League. At the second half of the 2015–16 season, Güngör joined the Third-League team Harb-İşspor. At the end of the season, she enjoyed her team's promotion to the Women's Second League.

International
Admitted to the Turkey girls' U-17 team, she played at the 2011 UEFA Women's Under-17 Championship qualification round matches and scored a goal against the Armenian girls.

Buse Güngör was called up to the Turkey women's U-19 team to appear at the 2011 UEFA Women's U-19 Championship First qualifying round and Second qualifying round matches. She played at the 2011 Kuban Spring Tournament and netted a goal against Ukraine women's U-19 team. Further, she played at the 2013 UEFA Women's U-19 Championship First qualifying round matches.

Career statistics
.

Honours
 Turkish Women's First League
 Derince Belediyespor (women)
 Third places (1): 2013–14.

 Turkish Women's Second League
 Kireçburnu Spor
 Runners-up (1): 2014–15, promotion to the Women's First League

References

External links

Living people
1994 births
Sportspeople from İzmit
Turkish women's footballers
Women's association football midfielders
Gölcükspor players
Derince Belediyespor women's players
Kireçburnu Spor players
20th-century Turkish sportswomen
21st-century Turkish sportswomen